Nicola Ravaglia (born 12 December 1988) is an Italian professional footballer who plays for Sampdoria as a goalkeeper.

Career

Cesena
Ravaglia made his Cesena and Serie B debut on 2006–07 Serie B season, and was loaned for U.S. Poggibonsi in the following season. After this loan, he was a first choice in 2008–09 Lega Pro Prima Divisione, which the club promoted back to Serie B. However, he was loaned again in the following season to F.C. Esperia Viareggio (also in co-ownership), and in the next, to SPAL 1907.

Ravaglia made his debut in Serie A on 10 September 2011, against Napoli. After the club relegated in 2012, he was the first choice in the first three rounds of 2012–13 Serie B, as well as five games before the winter break; since the arrival of Andrea Campagnolo, Ravaglia was the understudy. Ravaglia wore no.1 shirt for Cesena in 2012–13 season, but given to another youth product Andrea Rossini in 2013–14 season. (His new number 34 was taken by Cascione in mid-season)

Vicenza (loan)
On 23 August 2013, Ravaglia was signed by the third division club Vicenza Calcio, with Achille Coser moved to opposite direction. Vicenza had loaned out their goalkeepers Marcone and Pinsoglio to Serie B clubs. Ravaglia was the first choice for the Veneto club, despite in the promotion playoffs Enrico Alfonso was the first choice.

Parma
On 30 June 2014, Ravaglia (for €2.5 million), Lolli (for €1.5M) and Turchetta (for €1M) were signed by Parma for a total of €5 million, with Cascione (for €2.5M), Traoré (for €1.5M) and Crialese (for €1M) moved to opposite direction also for €5 million. On 8 July 2014, Ravaglia returned to the third division again, for Cosenza. On 25 June 2015, Ravaglia and fellow Cesena and Parma teammate Rossini became free agents after the bankruptcy of Parma.

Cremonese
On 7 July 2015, Ravaglia was signed by U.S. Cremonese.

Sampdoria
On 1 September 2020, Ravaglia signed a two-year contract with Sampdoria.

References

External links
 Official Player Profile at cesenacalcio.it 
 
 Player Stats at Lega Serie A official site 

Living people
1988 births
People from Forlì
Footballers from Emilia-Romagna
Association football goalkeepers
Italian footballers
A.C. Cesena players
U.S. Poggibonsi players
F.C. Esperia Viareggio players
S.P.A.L. players
U.S. Cremonese players
U.C. Sampdoria players
Serie A players
Serie B players
Serie C players
Sportspeople from the Province of Forlì-Cesena